Nardin Academy was founded by the Daughters of the Heart of Mary in 1857.  The academy includes a college preparatory high school for young women and a co-educational elementary school located in Buffalo, New York.  It also includes Montessori pre-school through 3rd grade, which is located in Buffalo, New York.

History
Nardin Academy was founded by the Society of the Daughters of the Heart of Mary over 160 years ago. Ernestine Nardin began the first Catholic school in Buffalo on Pearl Street before relocating to Franklin and Church Streets as St. Mary's Academy. It wasn't until 1890 that Miss Nardin moved the school to its current location on Cleveland Avenue. The school was named "The Nardin Academy" in 1917 and was changed in 1951 to the current "Nardin Academy."

Irene Murphy, DHM started Buffalo's first Montessori with the opening of Nardin Montessori in 1963. It was moved to the former John R. Oishei Estate on West Ferry upon its purchase (and Varue Oishei's generous donation) in 1996. It was finally opened to students in 1998.

Its campus is a contributing property in the Elmwood Historic District–East historic district.

Admission

In order to attend the high school, one must first take an entrance exam. The exam, held in November, lasts about three and one half hours and covers a variety of topics, including Logic, English and Math. A written application process along with short essay questions accompanies the exam. Most prospective students shadow a freshman girl during the selection process or after admission. If a girl is selected, she is sent a letter of acceptance in January.

Honors

In 2018, Nardin Academy High School was listed as the number one school in Buffalo, New York by Buffalo Business First for the seventeenth consecutive year.

Notable alumni
Diane English, Emmy Award-winning television producer
F. Scott Fitzgerald, author, attended elementary school 1905-1908
Sylvia Lark (1947–1990), visual artist; in 1992, she was the second inductee into Nardin Academy's Alumnae Hall of Fame.
 Stavros Niarchos (1909–1996), shipping tycoon
Anne-Imelda Radice, Chief of Staff to the U.S. Secretary of Education,
Margaret M. Sullivan, Washington Post New York Times public editor; former editor, The Buffalo News
Susan Elia MacNeal, New York Times Best Selling Author

References

External links
 School Website

Private elementary schools in New York (state)
Private middle schools in New York (state)
Catholic secondary schools in New York (state)
Girls' schools in New York (state)
Educational institutions established in 1857
Schools in Buffalo, New York
High schools in Buffalo, New York
National Register of Historic Places in Buffalo, New York
School buildings on the National Register of Historic Places in New York (state)
1857 establishments in New York (state)
Historic district contributing properties in Erie County, New York